Jewels of Brandenburg is a 1947 American crime film directed by Eugene Forde and written by Irving Cummings Jr. and Robert G. North. The film stars Richard Travis, Micheline Cheirel, Leonard Strong, Carol Thurston, Lewis Russell and Louis Mercier. The film was released on May 27, 1947, by 20th Century Fox.

Plot

Cast   
Richard Travis as Johnny Vickers
Micheline Cheirel as Claudette Grandet
Leonard Strong as Marcel Grandet
Carol Thurston as Carmelita Mendoza
Lewis Russell as Roger Hamilton 
Louis Mercier as Pierre Dijon
Fernando Alvarado as Pablo Mendoza
Eugene Borden as Miguel Solomon
Ralf Harolde as Koslic

References

External links 
 

1947 films
1940s English-language films
20th Century Fox films
American crime films
1947 crime films
Films directed by Eugene Forde
American black-and-white films
1940s American films
English-language crime films